Arkesh Singh Deo (Oriya: ଅର୍କେଶ୍ ସିଂହଦେଓ ; born 15 January 1986) is an Indian politician from Odisha and a leader of the Biju Janata Dal political party.
Arkesh Singh Deo is the youngest son of previous Bolangir MLA Ananga Udaya Singh Deo and great grandson of Odisha's former chief minister Rajendra Narayan Singh Deo. His elder brother Kalikesh Narayan Singh Deo is also an Indian politician from Odisha and a member of the 16th Lok Sabha, representing  Bolangir constituency in Odisha.

Early life
Arkesh Singh Deo was born to politician Ananga Udaya Singh Deo and Smt. Vijaya Laxmi Devi. He attended The Doon School, Dehradun. His grandfather, Maharaja Rajendra Narayan Singh Deo (31 March 1912 – 23 February 1975) was an Indian politician and the last ruler of the princely state of Patna in Odisha before Indian independence in 1947 and was also the Chief Minister of Orissa from 1967 to 1971.

See also
 Bolangir (Lok Sabha constituency)
 Indian general election in Orissa, 2009
 Biju Janata Dal
 Kalikesh Narayan Singh Deo
 Sangeeta Singh Deo

References

Biju Janata Dal politicians
The Doon School alumni
1986 births
Living people
Indian Hindus
Odisha politicians